Victor Chuchkov (Cyrillic:Виктор Чучков) (born 25 February 1946 in Gorna Oryahovitsa) is a Bulgarian composer and pianist. He graduated piano and composition from the Bulgarian State Conservatoire and has also studied at the Accademia Nazionale di Santa Cecilia in Rome. As a pianist, he has received international prizes like the Alfredo Casella Prize and Alessandro Casagrande Prize, both in Italy. As a composer, he is the author of "Letters from the Future" (after Ray Bradbury - for voice, rock band and symphony orchestra), concerto for piano and orchestra, piano trio and others.

References

External links

Composer and pianist Victor Chuchkov
 

1946 births
Bulgarian composers
Living people
People from Gorna Oryahovitsa